Selo is a settlement on the right bank of the Poljane Sora River north of Žiri in the Upper Carniola region of Slovenia.

References

External links

Selo on Geopedia

Populated places in the Municipality of Žiri